De Drie Zustersteden was a one-day road cycling race held annually around Dendermonde and Willebroek, Belgium between 1919 and 2012. It was held as a 1.2 event on the UCI Europe Tour from 2005 to 2008.

Winners

References

External links
Official website

Cycle races in Belgium
Defunct cycling races in Belgium
1919 establishments in Belgium
Recurring sporting events established in 1919
2012 disestablishments in Belgium
Recurring sporting events disestablished in 2012
UCI Europe Tour races